The Macedonian football champions (Championship: Шампионат, single: "Шампион", plural: Шампиони) are the annual winners of Macedonian First Football League, North Macedonia's premier annual football league competition. The title has been contested since 1929 in varying forms of competition.

List of Champions

1927-1941

Notes:
 All 3 teams finished with equal number of points.

WW2 1942-1944

SR Macedonia Champions

National Competitions

Macedonian First League

Key

1 The season was abandoned due to COVID-19 pandemic in North Macedonia.

Performance

The performance of various clubs is shown in the following table:

By club
Note: Bold indicates clubs currently playing in the top division.

References

External links
Football Federation of North Macedonia Official Site 
First League Current Stats 
MacedonianFootball.com 

List of Champions
List of Champions
Macedonia